Ischaemum jayachandranii is a species of perennial in the family Poaceae. It is found growing in marshy areas and in the rice fields of Kannur district in Kerala, India.

References

jayachandranii
Endemic flora of India (region)
Flora of Kerala
Critically endangered plants